The 2020 NRL Women's Premiership was the third season of professional women's rugby league in Australia.

Teams

Pre-season

Regular season 
The season operated under a round-robin format, with games played as curtain-raisers to the 2020 NRL Finals Series. The top two finishing teams then contested the Grand Final, which was played before the men's Grand Final on 25 October.

Ladder

Ladder progression 

 Numbers highlighted in green indicate that the team finished the round inside the top two.
 Numbers highlighted in blue indicates the team finished first on the ladder in that round.
 Numbers highlighted in red indicates the team finished last place on the ladder in that round.

Grand Final

Individual awards

Dally M Medal Awards Night 
The following awards were presented at the Dally M Medal Awards ceremony in Sydney on the night of 19 October 2020.

Dally M Medal Player of the Year: Ali Brigginshaw ( Brisbane Broncos)

Rookie of the Year: Kennedy Cherrington ( Sydney Roosters)

Try of the Year: Madison Bartlett for  New Zealand Warriors versus St. George Illawarra Dragons (17 October 2020). Footage of this try is available within the article and as the 3rd try of the game in the match highlights. 

Tackle of the Year: Hannah Southwell for  Sydney Roosters versus New Zealand Warriors (10 October 2020). Footage of this tackle is available within the article and within the match highlights.

Grand Final Day Awards 
The following awards were presented at ANZ Stadium on Grand Final day, 25 October 2020.

Veronica White Medal: Georgia Hale ( New Zealand Warriors).

Karyn Murphy Medal Player of the Match: Amber Hall ( Brisbane Broncos)

Statistical Awards 
Highest Point Scorer in Regular Season: Meg Ward ( Brisbane Broncos) 26 (1t 11g)

Top Try Scorers in Regular Season: Tamika Upton ( Brisbane Broncos) 4.

Highest Point Scorer across the Full Season: Meg Ward ( Brisbane Broncos) 30 (1t 13g)

Top Try Scorer across the Full Season: Tamika Upton ( Brisbane Broncos) 5

References

External links 
 

2020 NRL Women's season
2020 in women's rugby league
2020 in Australian rugby league
2020 in New Zealand rugby league